Woman Thou Art Loosed: On the 7th Day is a 2012 American drama film directed by Neema Barnette and starring Blair Underwood, Sharon Leal, Nicole Beharie Clyde R Jones, and Pam Grier.  It is the sequel to the 2004 film Woman Thou Art Loosed.

Plot

David and Kari Ames' lives are picture-perfect until their six-year-old daughter Mikayla goes missing. As a search for her persists during the course of a week, secrets that were hidden under the Ames' veneer unearth themselves and threaten to tear the couple and their marriage apart.

Cast
Blair Underwood as David Ames
Sharon Leal as Kari Ames
Nicole Beharie as Beth Hutchins
T. D. Jakes as himself
Nicoye Banks as Wil Bennet
Jaqueline Fleming as Tia
Reed R. McCants as Les
Zoe Carter as Mikayla Ames
Samantha Beaulieu as Pam
Tim Francis as Wayne
Patrick Weathers as Remy
Clyde R Jones, as Lemont
Pam Grier as Detective Barrick

Production
The film was shot in New Orleans.

Reception
The film has a 20% rating on Rotten Tomatoes.  On Metacritic, the film has a score of 29 out of 100 based on 4 critics, indicating "generally unfavorable reviews."  Wesley Morris of The Boston Globe gave the film a negative review and wrote that "this overplotted, underwritten, powerfully dumb soap-thriller has more professionalism than it deserves."  Justin Chang of Variety also gave the film a negative review, calling it "hysterically overwrought."

References

External links
 
 
 
 
 

2012 films
American drama films
Films shot in New Orleans
Films shot in Louisiana
Films directed by Neema Barnette
2010s English-language films
2010s American films